Henriette Henriksen (born 12 June 1970 in Stavanger) is a Norwegian team handball player and Olympic medalist. She received silver medals at the 1992 Summer Olympics in Barcelona with the Norwegian national team. Henriksen played 38 games for the national team during her career.

References

External links

1970 births
Living people
Norwegian female handball players
Olympic silver medalists for Norway
Olympic handball players of Norway
Handball players at the 1992 Summer Olympics
Sportspeople from Stavanger
Olympic medalists in handball
Medalists at the 1992 Summer Olympics
20th-century Norwegian women